Steven Wayne Tolleson (born November 1, 1983) is an American former professional baseball infielder who played in Major League Baseball (MLB) between 2010 and 2015. He is the son of former major leaguer Wayne Tolleson.

Amateur career
Tolleson had a career .425 batting average and 18 home runs at Paul M. Dorman High School in Roebuck, South Carolina. He also played for the University of South Carolina. In 2004, he played collegiate summer baseball with the Brewster Whitecaps of the Cape Cod Baseball League.

Professional career

Minnesota Twins
He was selected by the Minnesota Twins in the fifth round of the 2005 Major League Baseball Draft out of the University of South Carolina.

Tolleson batted .321 for the rookie Appalachian League Elizabethton Twins his first professional season to earn a promotion to the Beloit Snappers midway through the season. The Midwest League, however, proved to be too much for Tolleson as his batting average fell to .176. A year later, Tolleson redeemed himself, earning a Midwest League All-Star nod.

He was added to the Twins' 40-man roster on November 11, .

In , with the New Britain Rock Cats and Rochester Red Wings, Tolleson played all three outfield positions, second, short and third.

Oakland Athletics
On Feb 1, Tolleson was claimed off waivers by the Oakland Athletics. He made his big league debut with the A's on April 28 against the Toronto Blue Jays. Two days later, he picked up his first major league hit against Josh Roenicke of Toronto.

San Diego Padres
He was traded to the San Diego Padres on May 29, 2011, in exchange for a player to be named later.

Baltimore Orioles
On November 21, 2011, Tolleson signed a contract with the Baltimore Orioles.
On May 9, 2012, the Orioles purchased Tolleson's contract and called him up. He hit .183 in 71 at-bats over several stints. After the season, he was outrighted off the Orioles' 40-man roster but refused the assignment and elected free agency.

Chicago White Sox
On November 13, 2012, Tolleson signed a minor league deal with the Chicago White Sox with an invitation to spring training. He spent the season with the Triple-A Charlotte Knights.

Toronto Blue Jays
On December 17, 2013, Tolleson signed a minor league deal with the Toronto Blue Jays that included an invitation to spring training. He was sent to minor league camp on March 24, 2014. The Blue Jays selected his contract from the Triple-A Buffalo Bisons on May 1. He made his debut for the Jays the following day, and recorded a pinch-hit triple and an RBI against the Pittsburgh Pirates. The triple was the first of his Major League career. On May 14, Tolleson pitched for the first time in the Majors, getting the final out in a 15–4 loss to the Cleveland Indians. In pitching for the Blue Jays, he became just the seventh position player to do so for the franchise, and first since Jeff Mathis in 2012. Tolleson hit his first home run as a Blue Jay on May 23, helping the team to a 3–2 win over the Oakland Athletics. He played in 109 games for the Blue Jays in 2014, mostly as a pinch hitter and late-innings replacement, and hit .253 with 3 home runs and 16 RBI.

Tolleson opened the 2015 season as the backup infielder for the Blue Jays. On April 24, 2015, he was designated for assignment to make room on the roster for Michael Saunders. He cleared waivers on May 5, and was assigned to the Triple-A Buffalo Bisons, but chose to become a free agent. On May 7, Tolleson signed a new minor league contract with the Blue Jays, allowing him to bypass a 10-day waiting period before he could be recalled to Toronto. On May 10, Tolleson was re-added to the active roster, after Michael Saunders was placed on the disabled list. He suffered a groin injury in late May and was placed on the disabled list. On July 1, Tolleson was activated from the disabled list and designated for assignment for the second time in 2015. He remained in the minors through the end of the season. Tolleson appeared in 19 games for the Blue Jays in 2015, and batted .268 with 3 RBI. He elected free agency on October 5, 2015.

Second stint with Baltimore
On November 23, 2015, Tolleson signed a minor league contract with the Baltimore Orioles that included an invitation to spring training. He was released on May 24, 2016.

Kansas City Royals
On May 27, 2016, Tolleson signed a minor league contract with the Kansas City Royals. He became a free agent on November 7, 2016.

See also
List of second-generation Major League Baseball players

References

External links

1983 births
Living people
American expatriate baseball players in Canada
Oakland Athletics players
Baltimore Orioles players
Toronto Blue Jays players
South Carolina Gamecocks baseball players
Brewster Whitecaps players
Elizabethton Twins players
Beloit Snappers players
Gulf Coast Twins players
Fort Myers Miracle players
New Britain Rock Cats players
Rochester Red Wings players
Sacramento River Cats players
Tucson Padres players
Norfolk Tides players
Charlotte Knights players
Phoenix Desert Dogs players
Buffalo Bisons (minor league) players
Major League Baseball infielders